Carpodiptera mirabilis is a species of flowering plant in the family Malvaceae. It is found only in Cuba.

References

mirabilis
Endemic flora of Cuba
Critically endangered plants
Taxonomy articles created by Polbot